Acaena sericea is a species of low growing perennial plant native to southern Chile and Patagonia.

References
 Encyclopedia of Life entry
 GBIF entry

sericea